Anglia was a propaganda magazine which was published by the Information Research Department, a propaganda agency of the British Foreign Office in the period 1962–1992. The title of the magazine was a reference to the familiar name for Britain in the Soviet Union. Similar naming procedures were also employed for other propaganda periodicals such as Amerika and Jugoslavija both of which were distributed in the Soviet Union.

History and profile
Anglia was launched by the British propaganda agency Information Research Department in 1962. The magazine was printed in the United Kingdom and distributed in the Soviet Union. It came out quarterly. The founding editor-in-chief was Wright Miller who was replaced by Ned Thomas in the post in 1967. The magazine was used as a tool for visual diplomacy. It adopted a positive propaganda approach and featured articles in which the United Kingdom was shown as a wealthy, progressive and democratic country. The magazine also covered articles about the British literature and music. Children's literature by the British writers was also featured in the magazine which folded in 1992.

References

1968 establishments in the United Kingdom
1992 disestablishments in the United Kingdom
Cold War propaganda
Defunct political magazines published in the United Kingdom
Magazines established in 1968
Magazines disestablished in 1991
Quarterly magazines published in the United Kingdom
Propaganda newspapers and magazines
Russian-language magazines
State media